Bernd Kilian (born 15 December 1965) is a retired Swiss football defender.

While at FC Aarau he was part of the side that won the Swiss national title in 1992–93.

References

1965 births
Living people
Swiss men's footballers
Swiss Super League players
FC Aarau players
Grasshopper Club Zürich players
FC Wangen bei Olten players
Association football defenders